Dan Amboyer (born December 28, 1985) is an American actor, known for his starring roles on the Darren Star series Younger and the NBC spin-off series The Blacklist: Redemption, and for starring as Prince William of Wales in the television film William & Catherine: A Royal Romance. He also plays Luke on the Netflix comedy series Uncoupled opposite Neil Patrick Harris.

Life and career 
Amboyer was born in Detroit, to Claudia and Dr. Donald Amboyer. He attended The Roeper School and arts high school Interlochen Arts Academy. Amboyer subsequently continued his studies at the Carnegie Mellon School of Drama, where he was offered early admittance following his junior year of high school. After graduation, he relocated to New York City.

Amboyer has appeared in numerous television shows and films, and worked extensively in theatre. Amboyer is a founding member of the theatre company Exit, Pursued by a Bear. In 2019, he made his directorial debut helming the world premiere of Whirlwind Off-Broadway, which Elisabeth Vincentelli of The New Yorker called a "delightful 80 minutes."

He starred on the Darren Star hit series Younger and the NBC spin-off series The Blacklist: Redemption. He also starred as Prince William of Wales in the TV movie William & Catherine: A Royal Romance.

He can be seen as "Luke" on the hit Netflix comedy series Uncoupled opposite Neil Patrick Harris.

Personal life
On October 7, 2017, Amboyer publicly came out as gay and announced that he had married his long-term partner, Eric P. Berger. Amboyer's coming out sparked national attention with televised coverage on Access Hollywood, E! News and Entertainment Tonight.

Filmography

Films

Television

Video games

Off-Broadway
Orange Lemon Egg Canary by Rinne Groff — 2006 (PS 122)
As You Like It — 2007 (HERE Arts Center)
The Play About the Naked Guy — 2008 (Baruch Center for the Performing Arts)
Bash'd — 2008 (The Zipper Factory)
For the Love of Christ — 2009 (Cherry Lane Theatre)
Dido, Queen of Carthage — 2010 (Exit, Pursued by a Bear)
The Great Unknown by William Hauptman and Jim Wann — 2010 (The American Place Theatre)
Restoration Comedy by Amy Freed — 2010 (Exit, Pursued by a Bear)
These Seven Sicknesses — 2011 (Exit, Pursued by a Bear)
Friends and Relations — 2011 (Abingdon Theatre)
Remembrance of Things Past by Harold Pinter and Di Trevis, US premiere with Richard Armitage — 2014 (92nd Street Y)
Squash by AR Gurney, world premiere — (The Flea Theater) — 2016
 Directed the premiere of Whirlwind by Jordan Jaffe — 2019 (The Wild Project)

Regional theatre
The Importance of Being Earnest, directed by Matt Lenz — Jack 'Earnest' Worthing (The Cape Playhouse)
The Metromaniacs, world premiere by David Ives directed by Michael Kahn — Dorante (Shakespeare Theatre Company)
As You Like It, directed by Adrian Noble — Orlando (Old Globe Theatre)
Richard III, directed by Lindsay Posner — Henry VII (Old Globe Theatre)
Inherit the Wind, directed by Adrian Noble — Bertram Cates (Old Globe Theatre)
Le Grand Meaulnes, directed by Di Trevis — Augustin Meaulnes (Quantum Theatre)
The Eclectic Society — Tom Rockwell (Walnut Street Theatre)
Grease — Kenickie (The Muny)
Crazy for You — Lank Hawkins (North Shore Music Theatre)
Doctor Faustus — (Utah Shakespearean Festival)
Henry IV — (Utah Shakespearean Festival)
Romeo and Juliet — (Utah Shakespearean Festival)
Speak to Me, Annie — (Utah Shakespearean Festival)
My Fair Lady — (Utah Shakespearean Festival)
Camelot — Utah Shakespearean Festival
Godspell — Jesus (Meadow Brook Theatre)
A Christmas Carol — (Meadow Brook Theatre)
Swan Lake — (American Ballet Theatre)
Joseph and the Amazing Technicolor Dreamcoat starring Donny Osmond — National Tour
Urinetown, directed by John Carrafa — Officer Lockstock (Carnegie Mellon University)
As You Like It, directed by Di Trevis — Jaques (Carnegie Mellon University)
Compleat Female Stage Beauty — Ned Kynaston (Carnegie Mellon University)

References

External links
 
 
Instagram Page
 
 Dan Amboyer at The Hollywood Reporter
 Dan Amboyer Shakespeare Feature at San Diego U—T
 Dan Amboyer Photo Gallery at San Diego U-T
 Dan Amboyer at Deadline.com
 Dan Amboyer at Access Hollywood
 Dan Amboyer on The Hallmark Channel
 Dan Amboyer at the Pittsburgh Post-Gazette

1985 births
21st-century American male actors
American gay actors
American male film actors
American male stage actors
American male television actors
Carnegie Mellon University College of Fine Arts alumni
Interlochen Center for the Arts alumni
LGBT people from Michigan
Living people
Male actors from Detroit